Signal Studios is a developer of both video games and interactive software applications. The studio was founded by industry veterans, with experience working at some of the world's top studios and publishers, combining many years of knowledge across all disciplines of the games industry.

Signal is best known for their hit game, Toy Soldiers, one of the top 10 best-selling XBLA games of all time. As part of the Toy Soldiers franchise, they have also released  Toy Soldiers: Cold War and a number of DLCs for both titles. At E3 2012, the studio announced their first action RPG, Ascend: Hand of Kul.

The studio is currently located in Kirkland, Washington with over 40 employees.

History
In January 2008, Signal Studios was founded in Bothell, Washington by 3 individuals. Their first office was a house along the banks of the Sammamish River. In 2010, Signal relocated to a larger office building on the North Creek of Bothell. In 2012, the company moved to Kirkland, Washington, to reside in the offices of the now defunct Sandblast Games.

Games
Signal has released several games, as well as additional downloadable content (DLC), for both Xbox 360 (XBLA) and Windows.

2010
 Toy Soldiers (Xbox 360 + PC)
 Kaiser's Battle DLC
 Invasion DLC

2011
 Toy Soldiers: Cold War (Xbox 360) - featured in XBLA's Summer of Arcade 2011
 Evil Empire DLC
 Napalm DLC

2013
 Ascend: Hand of Kul
 Toy Soldiers: Complete

2015
 Toy Soldiers: War Chest (PlayStation 4, Xbox One, PC)

2021
 Toy Soldiers HD (Nintendo Switch, PlayStation 4, Xbox One, PC)

TBA
 Toy Soldiers: Cold War HD (Nintendo Switch, PlayStation 4, Xbox One)
 Toy Soldiers 2: Finest Hour (PC, PlayStation 4, Xbox One, Nintendo Switch)

Technology
Signal Studios uses an engine that was specifically designed for the development of multi-platform 3D games and simulations, called SigEngine. This suite of tools and features includes a clean object-oriented code base, a level design and entity creation tool (SigEd), modeling package plugins, shader and material editors (SigShade and MatEd), and an animation engine with a powerful script interface (SigAnim).

References

Video game companies of the United States
Video game development companies
Companies based in Kirkland, Washington
American companies established in 2008
Video game companies established in 2008
2008 establishments in Washington (state)